The Resistance started off as a low budget web series in the form of 4 short online teasers featured on YouTube.  Before filming the actual web show, the series was picked up by Sam Raimi’s Ghost House Pictures and Starz Media, after executives at Starz and Ghost House viewed "The Resistance" teasers online.

Plot
The Resistance is set in a world where brilliant chemist Syrus Primoris (Adrian Zaw) has taken control in the wake of a devastating plague virus that has killed 99% of the population. Only Primoris’ suppressant, called Noxe, keeps the survivors from succumbing to the plague. One group opposes his regime and fights to find another cure.

The web show aired on October 4, 2010, on the SyFy channel as a one-hour television pilot along with being released in its original 8 episodic form on iTunes, Xbox Live, and the PlayStation Network, and Dailymotion.  "The Resistance" is directed and created by Adrian Picardi, executive produced by Ben Ketai, Scott Bayless, Scott Rogers, with producers Aaron Lam, Eric Ro, and Associate Producer Don Le.

The series is produced by Starz Media, Ghost House Pictures, and Northern Five Entertainment.  The pilot was the first time a series created originally for the web premiered on television.

Characters
Arclite: A prince of Insurgo, Arclite was to have a traditional life of sincere religious study and intense military training.  Instead, Arclite has spent the majority of his life in drunken exile, wandering the wastelands of Aurordeca in an endless search for the forgiveness he will never allow himself to find.  Still, he is never truly alone.  He has the voices in his head to keep him company, and to ask the same haunting question: “What have you done?”

Lana (Katrina Law): Leader of the Aurordecan Resistance Movement (ARM), Lana has resigned herself to life as a “terrorist.”  Hit the enemy; steal what you need to survive, and never spend more than a few days in the same place.  Lana and her team live their lives on the razor’s edge of survival, and fight every day for the possibility of a future, for all of us.  She’s smart, incredibly tough and fueled by the betrayal that has made her the person she is today.  If Lana is to achieve her ultimate goal, she may have to let herself go to a place she swore never to visit again.

Syrus Primoris: Like a phoenix from the ashes, Syrus has risen from the devastation of plague and given the people of Aurordeca the gift of a suppressant, and a chance to live.  But a suppressant is not a cure.  And, like most gifts, it comes at a high cost. Now the Leader of Aurordeca, Syrus rules with a cold brutality demanding total loyalty from his people and his employees.  And the distinction between the two is blurred almost to the point of nonexistence. He has abolished all religion, giving his subjects, but a single thing to worship in its place:  Himself.  But Syrus hides a secret.  And, like most of us, he’ll do whatever it takes to keep it hidden.

Vince: Lana’s second in command, Vince has fought with ARM for many years.  He’s proven his worth as a fighter and as a loyal confidant.  But, he’s still, at his core, just a man.  And men have needs, even here on Aurordeca.  So when Arclite suddenly appears in the ARM camp, and diverts Lana’s attention, Vince isn’t real happy about it.

Circe & Eve: Circe is an assassin.  And she is great at it.  She found Eve wandering the streets as a child, just another plague orphan doomed to die alone.  But Circe saw something in this little girl and took her under her wing.  Circe cared for Eve and taught her so many things.  They are both extremely deadly, fluent in multiple weapons including their own powerful sexuality.  They are artists of pain. They serve Syrus as both concubines and killers.

Vero: Originally from Insurgo, Vero is Syrus’ right-hand man.  A soldier by trade, he has a body built to inflict damage and a mind for strategy and tactics.  If Syrus is the face of Primoris, Vero is its fist. He is Chief of Security and Commander the soldiers of Primoris.  As history has borne out, real power falls to those who control the guns.  Ruthless and self-serving, Vero is the ultimate survivor and practiced at conforming his position to the prevailing wind.  He also has his weaknesses.

Cian & Bran: When these two brothers decide to camp for the night in the snowy wasteland of Crovin on their way back from a very important mission, they unwittingly spark a flame that will end up consuming the lives of countless citizens and change Aurordeca forever.  The brothers have never known a world without the plague.  Like all boys they are quick to joke, but now on the verge of manhood, Cian and Bran are desperate to impress each other, and Vince.

References

External links
Official "The Resistance" Series Website
The Resistance Series on YouTube!
Syrus Primoris on TWITTER

Post-apocalyptic web series
American science fiction web series